Street Fighter is a Japanese video game series and multi-media franchise produced by Capcom.

Street Fighter may also refer to:

Capcom franchise 
Street Fighter (video game), the first game in the series
Street Fighter (1992 film), an unlicensed animated film based on the video games
Street Fighter II: The Animated Movie, an official animated film based on the video games
Street Fighter (1994 film), a live-action film based on the video games
Street Fighter (soundtrack), the original soundtrack for the film
Street Fighter (TV series), a TV series based on the video games
Street Fighter II V, a 1995 anime series based on the Street Fighter II game
Street Fighter: The Legend of Chun-Li, a 2009 film based on the video game series
Street Fighter: Assassin's Fist, a 2014 live-action web series, TV series and feature film
Street Fighter (Malibu Comics), 1993
Street Fighter (UDON comics), first published in 2003

1974 film trilogy 
The Street Fighter, a 1974 Japanese martial arts film
Return of the Street Fighter
The Street Fighter's Last Revenge

Other uses 
A person who participates in street fighting
Streetfighter, a type of customized motorcycle
Ducati Streetfighter, a naked motorcycle based on the above design principle
The Streetfighter, an alternative name for Hard Times, a 1975 film starring Charles Bronson
Streetfighter, a 1985 album by The Four Seasons
Streetfighter, a conceptual ship design that was part of the United States Navy SC-21 program
"Street Fighter", a song by Quiet Riot from the 2001 album Guilty Pleasures
"Street Fighter", a song by Blackfoot from the 1980 album Tomcattin'

See also 
Street Fight (disambiguation)
Road Fighter